The 2005 Korean FA Cup Final was a football match played on 17 December 2005 at Seoul World Cup Stadium in Seoul that decided the winner of the 2005 season of the Korean FA Cup. The 2005 final was the culmination of the 10th season of the tournament.

The final was contested by Ulsan Hyundai Mipo Dolphin and Jeonbuk Hyundai Motors. The match kicked off at 14:00 KST. Ulsan Hyundai Mipo was first non K-League club reached KFA Cup finals. The referee for the match was Kwon Jong-Chul.

Road to the final

Ulsan Hyundai Mipo Dolphin

1Ulsan's goals always recorded first.

Jeonbuk Hyundai Motors

1Jeonbuk's goals always recorded first.

Match details

See also
2005 Korean FA Cup

References

2005
FA
Korean FA Cup Final 2005